"Tänd på" is a song by Swedish alternative rock band Kent from their 10th studio album Jag är inte rädd för mörkret. It was released as the album's third and final single on 3 October 2012. Prior to its official release, the song charted at number 37 in Sweden.

Track listing

Charts

References

Kent (band) songs
2012 singles
Songs written by Joakim Berg
Songs written by Martin Sköld
2012 songs
Universal Music Group singles
Sonet Records singles

sv:Jag ser dig